The British Junior Open 2012 is the edition of the 2012's British Junior Open Squash, which is a World Junior Squash Circuit event Tier 2. The event took place in Sheffield in England from 2 to 6 January.

Draw and results
Restricted from the quarter final

Under 19

Boys Under 19

Girls Under 19

Under 17

Boys Under 17

Girls Under 17

Under 15

Boys Under 15

Girls Under 15

Under 13

Boys Under 13

Girls Under 13

See also
British Junior Open
2012 Men's World Junior Squash Championships
2012 Women's World Junior Squash Championships
World Junior Squash Circuit

References

External links
British Junior Open 2012 SquashSite website

British Junior Open Squash
British Junior Open
British Junior Open
British Junior Open Squash
Squash in England
2010s in Sheffield
Sports competitions in Sheffield